Samantha Bremner (born 19 December 1991) is an Australian rugby league footballer who plays as a  for the Sydney Roosters in the NRL Women's Premiership and the Cronulla-Sutherland Sharks in the NSWRL Women's Premiership. 

She previously played for the St. George Illawarra Dragons in the NRLW and is a New South Wales and Australia representative, winning two World Cups

Background
Born in Sydney, Bremner's father, Gary Hammond, was a professional rugby league player for the Cronulla-Sutherland Sharks and Illawarra Steelers in the 1980s.

Playing career
In 2012, while playing for the Helensburgh Tiger Lillies, Bremner made her debut for New South Wales, scoring a try in a 10–34 loss to Queensland. In July 2013, she was a member of Australia's World Cup-winning squad, scoring five tries in a 72–0 win over France and a try in the final against New Zealand.

In 2017, Bremner was a member of Australia's World Cup-winning squad but missed the final due to injury.

In June 2018, she was joined the St George Illawarra Dragons NRL Women's Premiership team, being named captain. In July 2018, Bremner represented New South Wales Country at the NRL Women's National Championships, winning the Player of the Carnival award. 

In Round 1 of the 2018 NRL Women's season, she made her debut in the Dragons' 4–30 loss to the Brisbane Broncos, scoring the Dragons only try. She fractured her toe in the loss, ruling her out for the season.

In 2019, Bremner sat out the 2019 NRL Women's season due to the birth of her first child. Instead, she joined the team's coaching staff as an assistant coach.

In February 2020, she returned to rugby league, captaining the Dragons successful 2020 NRL Nines side. In Round 1 of the 2020 NRL Women's season, she played her first NRLW game in 755 days in a 4–18 loss to the Sydney Roosters.

In September 2022, Bremner was named in the Dream Team announced by the Rugby League Players Association. The team was selected by the players, who each cast one vote for each position.

Achievements and accolades

Individual
RLPA Players' Champion: 2016

Team
2013 Women's Rugby League World Cup: Australia – Winners
2017 Women's Rugby League World Cup: Australia – Winners

References

External links
St George Illawarra Dragons profile

1991 births
Living people
Australian female rugby league players
Australia women's national rugby league team players
Rugby league fullbacks
St. George Illawarra Dragons (NRLW) players